Ryno Eksteen (born 3 October 1994 in Centurion) is a South African rugby union player for the Seattle Seawolves in Major League Rugby. His regular position is fly-half or full-back.

Career

His performance saw him called up to the 2012 South African Schools side that played against France, Wales and England in August 2012.

However, a knee injury ruled him out of action for the 2013 season.

Stormers

He was included in the pre-season training squad for the  prior to the 2014 Super Rugby season and also made the final Stormers squad.

References

South African rugby union players
Living people
1994 births
People from Centurion, Gauteng
Stormers players
Western Province (rugby union) players
Rugby union fly-halves
Rugby union players from Gauteng
Free State Cheetahs players
Cheetahs (rugby union) players
Seattle Seawolves players